Deans Creek is a river in the U.S. State of Texas.

References

Rivers of Texas
Rivers of San Jacinto County, Texas